The final match of the 2013 FIBA Asia Championship was the game of the 2013 FIBA Asia Championship in the Philippines to determine the champion and runner-up. The game currently holds the most watched FIBA game in a tournament, even beating the FIBA Basketball World Cup.

Road to the Final

Final

Philippines vs. Iran

Box scores

|-
|4 ||align=left|Jimmy Alapag ||20:38 ||4-8 ||50 ||3-6 ||50 ||2-2 ||100 ||0 ||0 ||0 ||3 ||1 ||1 ||0 ||0 ||13
|-
|5 ||align=left|LA Tenorio ||19:09 ||3-8 ||38 ||2-6 ||33 ||0-0 ||0 ||0 ||3 ||3 ||3 ||3 ||1 ||1 ||0 ||8
|-
|6 ||align=left|Jeffrei Chan ||15:38 ||2-6 ||33 ||1-5 ||20 ||2-2 ||100 ||1 ||1 ||2 ||0 ||2 ||1 ||0 ||0 ||7
|-
|7 ||align=left|Jayson William ||27:55 ||5-13 ||38 ||1-2 ||50 ||7-9 ||78 ||0 ||1 ||1 ||3 ||0 ||3 ||0 ||0 ||18
|-
|8 ||align=left|Gary David ||05:16 ||1-3 ||33 ||0-0 ||0 ||0-0 ||0 ||0 ||0 ||0 ||1 ||3 ||0 ||0 ||0 ||2
|-
|9 ||align=left|Ranidel De Ocampo ||27:09 ||3-13 ||23 ||2-8 ||25 ||1-1 ||100 ||3 ||3 ||6 ||1 ||4 ||1 ||3 ||0 ||9
|-
|10 ||align=left|Gabe Norwood ||27:32 ||0-4 ||0 ||0-2 ||0 ||3-4 ||75 ||1 ||2 ||3 ||2 ||3 ||1 ||3 ||0 ||3
|-
|11 ||align=left|Marcus Douthit ||colspan=16 align=left|Did not play 
|-
|12 ||align=left|Larry Fonacier ||11:26 ||1-4 ||25 ||1-3 ||33 ||0-0 ||0 ||0 ||1 ||1 ||1 ||1 ||0 ||0 ||0 ||3
|-
|13 ||align=left|June Mar Fajardo ||08:17 ||0-2 ||0 ||0-0 ||0 ||1-2 ||50 ||3 ||1 ||4 ||0 ||2 ||1 ||0 ||0 ||1
|-
|14 ||align=left|Japeth Aguilar ||16:58 ||2-7 ||29 ||0-2 ||0 ||0-1 ||0 ||1 ||3 ||4 ||0 ||4 ||0 ||1 ||0 ||4
|-
|15 ||align=left|Marc Pingris ||19:56 ||1-1 ||100 ||0-0 ||0 ||1-2 ||50 ||3 ||5 ||8 ||0 ||3 ||1 ||2 ||0 ||3
|-
|align=left colspan=2|Totals || ||22-69 ||32 ||10-34 ||29 ||17-23 ||74 ||12 ||20 ||32 ||14 ||26 ||10 ||10 ||0 ||71
|}

|-
|4 ||align=left|Mohammad Jamshidi ||colspan=16 align=left|Did not play 
|-
|5 ||align=left|Aren Davoudi ||21:46 ||1-3 ||33 ||0-2 ||0 ||0-0 ||0 ||0 ||2 ||2 ||3 ||1 ||1 ||0 ||0 ||2
|-
|6 ||align=left|Javad Davari ||colspan=16 align=left|Did not play 
|-
|7 ||align=left|Mehdi Kamrani ||35:09 ||5-13 ||38 ||2-6 ||33 ||3-4 ||75 ||3 ||4 ||7 ||5 ||3 ||3 ||1 ||0 ||15
|-
|8 ||align=left|Saman Veisi ||colspan=16 align=left|Did not play 
|-
|9 ||align=left|Oshin Sahakian ||28:40 ||3-7 ||43 ||0-3 ||0 ||6-6 ||100 ||1 ||11 ||12 ||2 ||4 ||1 ||0 ||0 ||12
|-
|10 ||align=left|Hamed Afagh ||33:57 ||2-6 ||33 ||0-4 ||0 ||0-0 ||0 ||2 ||3 ||5 ||1 ||1 ||3 ||1 ||0 ||4
|-
|11 ||align=left|Hamed Sohrabnejad ||10:01 ||1-2 ||50 ||0-0 ||0 ||0-0 ||0 ||0 ||4 ||4 ||0 ||2 ||1 ||0 ||0 ||2
|-
|12 ||align=left|Asghar Kardoust ||08:36 ||1-1 ||100 ||0-0 ||0 ||0-0 ||0 ||0 ||2 ||2 ||0 ||1 ||0 ||0 ||0 ||2
|-
|13 ||align=left|Rouzbeh Arghavan ||00:48 ||0-0 ||0 ||0-0 ||0 ||0-0 ||0 ||0 ||0 ||0 ||0 ||1 ||0 ||0 ||0 ||0
|-
|14 ||align=left|Samad Nikkhah Bahrami ||31:54 ||5-14 ||36 ||1-2 ||50 ||8-9 ||89 ||1 ||2 ||3 ||7 ||4 ||6 ||0 ||0 ||19
|-
|15 ||align=left|Hamed Haddadi ||29:06 ||12-15 ||80 ||0-0 ||0 ||5-7 ||71 ||6 ||10 ||16 ||2 ||4 ||3 ||0 ||2 ||29
|-
|align=left colspan=2|Totals || ||30-61 ||49 ||3-17 ||18 ||22-26 ||85 ||13 ||38 ||51 ||20 ||21 ||18 ||2 ||2 ||85
|}

External links

Final
Iran at the 2013 FIBA Asia Championship
Final
Philippines men's national basketball team games
Iran national basketball team games
August 2013 sports events in Asia